Tanita is a genus of grasshoppers in the tribe Pyrgomorphini found in Africa.

Species
The Orthoptera Species File lists the following:
 Tanita brachyptera Bolívar, 1912
 Tanita breviceps (Bolívar, 1882) - type species (as Pyrgomorpha breviceps Bolívar, I., by subsequent designation)
 Tanita lineaalba (Bolívar, 1889)
 Tanita loosi Bolívar, 1904
 Tanita parva Kevan, 1962
 Tanita purpurea Bolívar, 1904
 Tanita rosea (Bolívar, 1908)
 Tanita stulta Bolívar, 1912
 Tanita subcylindrica (Bolívar, 1882)

References

External Links 
 

Pyrgomorphidae
Caelifera genera
Orthoptera of Africa